Klaus Linnenbruegger is a German former footballer and coach who briefly played professionally in Germany and coached Canadian clubs.

Playing career
Linnenbruegger began his professional career in his native city of Bielefeld with VFB03 Bielefeld at the junior level and finally at the senior level. In 1971, he emigrated to Canada and landed in Ottawa, Ontario. During his tenure in Canada he played with Ottawa St.Anthony Italia, Ottawa Cenntenials Soccer Club, and Ottawa Maple Leaf Almrausch with whom he finished second in the 1980 The Challenge Trophy tournament.

Managerial career
Linnenbruegger`s first major coaching duty was with the Ottawa Wizards of the Canadian Professional Soccer League. where he had a tremendous season recording a 17 game undefeated streak, and making CPSL history by becoming the second club to achieve a treble the first being the Toronto Olympians. The Wizards clinched the Eastern Conference and finished first in the overall standings. He guided Ottawa to repeat their success in the Open Canada Cup tournament by defending their title once more in a 1-0 victory over Toronto Croatia.

The next season, he was replaced by Hubert Busby, Jr., but was reinstated as head coach on September 10, 2003. He finished off the season with a six game undefeated streak and clinched their division. The Wizards announced their withdrawal from the Rogers Cup stating disagreement with the rules of competition. On May 26, 2011 he served as assistant coach to the Ottawa Fury of the USL Premier Development League. He was appointed interim head coach for the Fury for the remainder of the 2011 season after the early departure of head coach Steve Payne.

Honors
Ottawa Wizards
 Rogers Cup: 2002
 Open Canada Cup: 2002
 Canadian Professional Soccer League Eastern Conference Champions: 2002, 2003

References 

Living people
German footballers
German football managers
Canadian soccer coaches
Canadian Soccer League (1998–present) managers
Sportspeople from Bielefeld
Association footballers not categorized by position
Footballers from North Rhine-Westphalia
Year of birth missing (living people)